Somatidia pernitida is a species of beetle in the family Cerambycidae. It was described by McKeown in 1940. It is known from Australia.

References

pernitida
Beetles described in 1940